Owenyo (formerly, New Owenyo) was an unincorporated community in Inyo County, California. The town was abandoned in the 1960s, and all that remain now are a few traces of building foundations. There are no standing structures and no inhabitants in or anywhere near Owenyo, which remains on 21st century maps only as a reference point along the bleak, unkept  and itself abandoned Owenyo-Lone Pine Road which runs about two miles east of, and running parallel with, Federal Highway 395.

Owenyo's original townsite was half a mile (0.8 km) to the southeast on the Carson and Colorado Railroad. The town, whose name is a portmanteau of Owens and Inyo, was originally started by Quaker colonists in 1900. They sold out in 1905, when the Carson and Colorado Railroad arrived, establishing the town as a transfer point for freight to be carried by the narrow-gauge railway which began there, serving points southward. A post office operated at Owenyo from 1902 to 1905 and from 1916 to 1941. The town moved to its present location in 1910, and for a while was known as New Owenyo on that account.

References

Unincorporated communities in California
Unincorporated communities in Inyo County, California
Populated places in the Mojave Desert
Populated places established in 1900